Jevišovka (until 1949 Frélichov;) is a municipality and village in Břeclav District in the South Moravian Region of the Czech Republic. It has about 700 inhabitants.

Geography
It is situated in the Dyje–Svratka Valley. It lies on the confluence of the Jevišovka and Thaya rivers.

History
The first written mention of Jevišovka is from 1353. The village was founded by German colonists in the early 13th century. From the late 14th century until 1848, Jevišovka was property of the House of Liechtenstein as a part of the Drnholec estate.

In the past a large Moravian Croat community lived in the village. In 1930, Croats made 74% and Germans 17% of the population.

References

Villages in Břeclav District
Croatian communities in the Czech Republic